Hebei  or ,  (alternately Hopeh) is a northern province of China. Hebei is China's sixth most populous province, with over 75 million people. Shijiazhuang is the capital city. The province is 96% Han Chinese, 3% Manchu, 0.8% Hui, and 0.3% Mongol. Three Mandarin dialects are spoken: Jilu Mandarin, Beijing Mandarin and Jin.

Hebei borders the provinces of Shanxi to the west, Henan to the south, Shandong to the southeast, Liaoning to the northeast, and the Inner Mongolia Autonomous Region to the north. Its economy is based on agriculture and manufacturing. The province is China's premier steel producer, although the steel industry creates serious air pollution.

Five UNESCO World Heritage Sites can be found in the province, the: Great Wall of China, Chengde Mountain Resort, Grand Canal, Eastern Qing tombs, and Western Qing tombs. It is also home to five National Famous Historical and Cultural Cities: Handan, Baoding, Chengde, Zhengding and Shanhaiguan.

Historically, during the Spring and Autumn period and the Warring States period, the region was ruled by the Chinese Yan and Zhao states. During the Yuan dynasty, the region was called the Zhongshu Province. It was called North Zhili during the Ming dynasty, and Zhili Province during the Qing dynasty. The modern-day province of Hebei was created in 1928.

Etymology 
Hebei Province received its name from its location in the North China Plain, north of the Yellow River. Hebei means "north of the river". Since the province is recorded in Yu Gong as Ji Province, or Jizhou, it is abbreviated as Ji.

The province's nickname is Yanzhao, which is the collective name of the Yan and Zhao states that controlled the region during the Spring and Autumn period and the Warring States period. In 1421, the Yongle Emperor moved the capital from Nanjing to Beijing and the province started to be called North Zhili or Zhili, which means "Directly Ruled (by the Imperial Court)". When  Nanjing became the capital of the Republic of China in 1928, the Zhili province was abolished and given its present name, Hebei.

History

Pre and early history 
Peking man, an early pre-historic Homo erectus, lived on the plains of Hebei around 200,000 to 700,000 years ago. Neolithic findings at the prehistoric Beifudi site date to 7000 and 8000 BC.

Many early Chinese myths are set in the province. Fuxi, one of the Three Sovereigns and Five Emperors, is said to have lived in present-day Xingtai. The mythical Battle of Zhuolu, won by the Yellow Emperor, Yan Emperor, and their Yanhuang tribes against the Chiyou-led Jiuli tribes, took place in Zhangjiakou and started the Huaxia civilization.

During the Spring and Autumn period (722 BC–476 BC), Hebei was under the rule of Yan in the north and Jin in the south. Also during this period, a nomadic people known as Dí invaded the plains of northern China and established Zhongshan in central Hebei. In the Warring States period (403 BC–221 BC), Jin was partitioned and much of its territory in Hebei went to Zhao.

Qin and Han dynasties 

The Qin dynasty unified China in 221 BC. The Han dynasty (206 BC–220 AD) ruled the area under two provinces, You Prefecture in the north and Ji Province in the south. At the end of the Han dynasty, most of Hebei was under the control of warlords Gongsun Zan in the north and Yuan Shao further south. Yuan Shao emerged as the victor of the two, but he was defeated by Cao Cao in the Battle of Guandu in 200. Hebei came under the rule of the Kingdom of Wei, established by the descendants of Cao Cao.

Jin through the Three Kingdoms 
After the invasions of northern nomadic peoples at the end of the Western Jin dynasty, chaos ensued in the Sixteen Kingdoms and the Northern and Southern dynasties. Because of its location on the northern frontier, Hebei changed hands many times and was controlled at various times by Later Zhao, Former Yan, Former Qin, and Later Yan. The Northern Wei reunified northern China in 440 but split in 534, with Hebei coming under Eastern Wei; then the Northern Qi, with its capital at Ye near modern Linzhang, Hebei. The Sui dynasty again unified China in 589.

Tang and Five dynasties 
During the Tang dynasty (618–907), the area was officially called Hebei for the first time. The Great Yan State was established in Hebei from 756 to 763 during the An Lushan Rebellion. After the rebellion, Lulong Jiedushi retained its autonomy from Tang during most of the 9th century. During the late Five Dynasties and Ten Kingdoms period, Lulong was fragmented among several regimes including the short-lived Yan. It was eventually annexed in 913 by Li Cunxu, who established the Later Tang (923–936). Emperor Gaozu of the Later Jin dynasty ceded much of northern Hebei to the Khitan Liao dynasty. This territory, called the Sixteen Prefectures of Yanyun, became a weakness in the Chinese defense against the Khitans for the next century because it lay within the Great Wall.

Song through Yuan dynasties 
During the Northern Song dynasty (960–1127), the sixteen ceded prefectures continued to be an area of contention between Song China and the Liao dynasty. Later, the Southern Song dynasty abandoned all of North China, including Hebei, to the Jurchen Jin dynasty after the 1127 Jingkang Incident of the Jin–Song wars. Hebei was heavily affected by the flooding of the Yellow River; between 1048 and 1128, the river ran directly through the province rather than to its south.

The Mongol Yuan dynasty divided China into provinces but did not establish Hebei as a province. Instead, the area was directly administrated by the Secretariat at the capital Dadu.

Ming and Qing dynasties 
The Ming dynasty ruled Hebei as Beizhili, meaning Northern Directly Ruled because the area contained and was directly ruled by the imperial capital in Beijing. The "Northern" designation was used because there was a southern counterpart covering present-day Jiangsu and Anhui. When the Manchu Qing dynasty came to power in 1644, they abolished the southern counterpart, and Hebei became known as Zhili or Directly Ruled. During the Qing dynasty, the northern borders of Zhili extended deep into Inner Mongolia and overlapped in jurisdiction with the leagues of Inner Mongolia.

Republic of China 

The Qing dynasty collapsed in 1912 and was replaced by the Republic of China. In a few years, China descended into a civil war, with regional warlords vying for power. Since Zhili was so close to the capital of Peking (Beijing), it was the site of the Zhiwan War, the First Zhifeng War, and the Second Zhifeng War. With the success of the Northern Expedition in 1926 and 1927 by the Kuomintang, the capital was moved from Peking to Nanking (Nanjing). As a result, the provence's name was changed to Hebei, reflecting the relocation of the capital and its standard provincial administration.

During the World War II, Hebei was under the control of the Reorganized National Government of the Republic of China, a puppet state of Imperial Japan.

People's Republic of China 
The founding of the People's Republic of China saw several changes. The region around Chengde, previously part of Rehe Province (historically part of Manchuria), and the region around Zhangjiakou, previously part of Chahar Province (historically part of Inner Mongolia), were merged into Hebei. This extended its borders northwards beyond the Great Wall. Meanwhile, the city of Puyang was carved away, causing Hebei to lose access to the Yellow River. The city became part of the short-lived Pingyuan Province before eventually being annexed into Henan. 

The capital was also moved from Baoding to the new city of Shijiazhuang, and, for a short period, to Tianjin. On July 28, 1976, Tangshan was struck by the Tangshan earthquake, the deadliest earthquake of the 20th century, killing over 240,000 people. There were a series of smaller earthquakes in the following decade.

Today, Hebei, along with Beijing and Tianjin municipalities which it includes, make up the Jing-Jin-Ji megalopolis region. With a population of 130 million, it is about six times the size of the New York metropolitan area and is one of the largest megalopolis clusters in China. Beijing had also unloaded some of its non-capital functions to the province with the establishment of the Xiong'an New Area, which integrates the three municipalities.

Geography 
Hebei is the only province in China to contain plateaus, mountains, hills, shorelines, plains, and lakes. Most of central and southern Hebei lies within the North China Plain. Western Hebei rises into the Taihang Mountains (Taihang Shan), while the Yan Mountains (Yan Shan) runs through northern Hebei. Beyond the mountains are the grasslands of Inner Mongolia.

Hebei borders the Bohai Sea on the east. The Hai River watershed covers most of the province's central and southern parts; the Luan River watershed covers the northeast. Excluding manmade reservoirs, the largest lake in Hebei is Baiyangdian, located in Anxin County, Baoding.

Major cities in Hebei include: Shijiazhuang, Baoding, Tangshan, Qinhuangdao, Handan, and Zhangjiakou.  

Hebei has a monsoon-influenced humid continental climate. Its winters are cold and dry, while its summers are hot and humid.

Government 

The politics of Hebei is structured in a dual party-government system like all other governing institutions in mainland China. The Governor of Hebei is the highest-ranking official in the People's Government of Hebei. However, in the province's dual party-government governing system, the governor has less power than the Hebei Chinese Communist Party Provincial Committee Secretary (CCP Party Chief).

Administrative divisions 

Hebei has eleven prefecture-level divisions. All are prefecture-level cities:

These eleven prefecture-level divisions are subdivided into 168 county-level divisions (47 districts, 21 county-level cities, 94 counties and 6 autonomous counties). Those are, in turn, divided into 2207 township-level divisions (1 district public office, 937 towns, 979 townships, 55 ethnic townships, and 235 subdistricts). At the end of 2017, the total population of Hebei was 75.2 million.

Urban areas

Notes

Economy 

In 2014, Hebei's gross domestic product (GDP} was 2.942 trillion yuan (US$479 billion). It is ranked sixth in the PRC, with its GDP per capita reaching 40,124 renminbi. As of 2011, the primary, secondary, and tertiary sectors of industry contributed 203.46 billion, 877.74 billion, and 537.66 billion RMB respectively. The registered urban unemployment rate was 3.96%.

Hebei's industries include textiles, coal, steel, iron, engineering, chemical production, petroleum, power, ceramics, and food. 40% of Hebei's labor force works in the agriculture, forestry, and animal husbandry sectors, with the majority of production from these industries going to Beijing and Tianjin. Hebei's main agricultural products are cereal crops, including wheat, maize, millet, and sorghum. Cash crops like cotton, peanut, soybeans and sesame are also produced.

Hebei has abundant natural resources. The Kailuan mine in Tangshan, with a history of over 100 years, is one of China's first modern coal mines. It remains active, with an annual production of over 20 million metric tonnes. Much of the North China Oilfied is within Hebei. There are major iron mines at Handan and Qian'an. Iron and steel manufacturing are the largest industries in Hebei.

Economic and technological development zones
 Baoding Hi-Tech Industry Development Zone
 Langfang Export Processing Zone
 Qinhuangdao Economic & Technological Development Zone
 Qinhuangdao Export Processing Zone
 Shijiazhuang Hi-Tech Industrial Development Zone
 Xiong'an New Area

Demographics 
The population in Hebei is mostly Han Chinese. There are 55 ethnic minorities in Hebei, representing 4.27% of the total population. The largest ethnic groups are Manchu (2.1 million people), Hui (600,000 people), and Mongol (180,000 people). Population totals do not include those in active service with the People's Liberation Army.

In 2019, the birth rate was 10.83 births per 1,000 people, while the death rate was 6.12 deaths per 1,000 people. The male population is 37,679,003 (50.50%), the female population is 36,931,232 (49.50%). The gender ratio of the total population was 102.02, decreasing by 0.82 from 2010.

Religion 

The dominant religions in Hebei are Chinese folk religions, Taoist traditions, and Chinese Buddhism. According to surveys conducted in 2007 and 2009, 5.52% of the population believe in and are involved in ancestor veneration, while 3.05% identify as Christian, belonging mostly to the Catholic Church. As of 2010 Muslims constitute 0.82% of the population of Hebei.

Although the surveys did not provide specific data for other religions, 90.61% of the population are either nonreligious or are involved in worship of nature deities, Buddhism, Confucianism, Taoism, and folk religious sects. Zailiism is a folk religious sect that originated in Hebei. Local worship of deities organized into benevolent churches in reaction to Catholicism in the Qing dynasty.

Hebei has the largest Catholic population in China, with one million members and 1.5 million Catholics according to the Catholic Church. In 1900, apparition of the Virgin Mary was said have appeared in the town of Donglu in Baoding. As a result, Donglu is "one of the strongholds of the unofficial Catholic Church in China". Many Catholics in Hebei remain loyal to the Pope and reject the authority of the Catholic Patriotic Church. Four of Hebei's underground bishops have been imprisoned in recent years: Bishop Francis An Shuxin of Donglu since 1996; Bishop James Su Zhimin since October 1997; Bishop Han Dingxiang of Yongnian who died in prison in 2007, and Bishop Julius Jia Zhiguo of Zhengding since late 1999.

Culture

Language 
People speak dialects of Mandarin across the Hebei, with most classified as part of the Ji Lu Mandarin subdivision of Chinese. Along the western border with Shanxi, dialects are distinct enough for linguists to consider them as part of Jin, another subdivision of Chinese. In general, the dialects of Hebei are similar to the Beijing dialect, which forms the basis for Standard Chinese and the official language of the nation. However, there are also some distinct differences, such as the pronunciation of some words, made by entering tone syllables (syllables ending on a plosive) in Middle Chinese.

Arts 

Traditional forms of Chinese opera in Hebei include Pingju, Hebei Bangzi (Hebei Clapper Opera), and Cangzhou Kuaiban Dagu. Pingju is especially popular because it tends to use colloquial language which is easier for audiences to understand. Originating from northeastern Hebei, Pingju was influenced by other forms of Chinese opera such as Beijing opera. Traditionally Pingju has a xiaosheng (young male lead), a xiaodan (young female lead), and a xiaohualian (young comic character), though it has diversified to include other roles.

Quyang County, in central Hebei, is noted for Ding ware, a type of Chinese ceramics which includes various vessels such as bowls, plates, vases, and cups, as well as figurines. Ding ware is usually creamy white, though it is also made in other colors.

Cuisine 
Hebei cuisine is typically based on wheat, mutton, and beans. The donkey burger, originating from the cities of Baoding and Hejian, Cangzhou, is a staple in provincial cuisine and has spread into the two municipalities. Other dishes include local variants of shaobing.

Entertainment 
Beidaihe, located near Shanhaiguan, is a popular beach resort.

Architectural and cultural sites 

The Ming Great Wall crosses the northern part of Hebei, and its eastern end is located on the coast at Shanhaiguan (Shanhai Pass), near Qinhuangdao. Informally known as the First Pass of The World, Shanhaiguan Pass was where Ming general Wu Sangui opened the gates to Manchu forces in 1644, beginning nearly 300 years of Manchu rule.

The Chengde Mountain Resort and its outlying temples are a World Heritage Site. Also known as the Rehe Palace, this was the summer resort of the Manchu Qing dynasty emperors. The resort was built between 1703 and 1792. It consists of a palace complex and a large park with lakes, pavilions, causeways, and bridges. There are also several Tibetan Buddhist and Han Chinese temples in the surrounding area.

There are Qing dynasty imperial tombs at Zunhua (Eastern Qing Tombs) and Yixian (West Qing Tombs). The Eastern Qing Tombs are the resting place of 161 Qing emperors, empresses, and other members of the Qing imperial family, while the West Qing Tombs have 76 burials. Both tomb complexes are part of a World Heritage Site.

The Zhaozhou, or Anji Bridge, was built by Li Chun during the Sui dynasty and is the oldest stone arch bridge in China. It is one of the most significant examples of pre-modern Chinese civil engineering. Baoding, the old provincial capital, contains the historic Zhili governor's residence and the former court.

Today, the area houses a memorial site.

Sports 
The 2018 Women's Bandy World Championship was held in Hebei. Sports teams based in Hebei include National Basketball League (China), Hebei Springs Benma, and the Chinese Football Association team Hebei F.C., Hebei Elite F.C., and Cangzhou Mighty Lions F.C. Baoding is home to the Baoding balls, a kind of metal ball for exercise and meditation.

Education 

Under the national Ministry of Education:
 North China Electric Power University

Under other national agencies:
 Central Institute for Correctional Police
 Chinese People's Armed Police Force Academy
 North China Institute of Science and Technology

Under the provincial government:
 Chengde Medical College
 Handan College
 Hebei Agricultural University
 Hebei Engineering University
 Hebei Institute of Architecture and Civil Engineering
 Hebei Medical University
 Hebei Normal University
 Hebei Normal University of Science and Technology
 Hebei North University
 Hebei Physical Educational Institute
 North China University of Science and Technology
 Hebei University
 Hebei University of Economics and Business
 Hebei University of Technology
 Hebei University of Science and Technology
 Hengshui University
 Langfang Teacher's College
 North China Coal Medical College
 Shijiazhuang College
 Shijiazhuang Railway Institute
 Shijiazhuang University of Economics
 Tangshan College
 Tangshan Teacher's College
 Xingtai University
 Yanshan University
There are also Tibetan Buddhist schools in the province.

Infrastructure

Transportation

Intracity Rail 
The Shijiazhuang Metro is the only operational rapid transit system in Hebei. Xiong'an Rail Transit is a planned metro system in Xiong'an.

Intercity Rail 
As of early 2013, railway schedule systems listed 160 passenger train stations within the province. Because Hebei surrounds Beijing and Tianjin, all the important railway lines from these cities pass through Hebei. The Beijing–Guangzhou railway is one of the most important. It passes through many major cities, including Baoding, Shijiazhuang, Xingtai and Handan on its way south to Henan. Other important railways include the Beijing–Kowloon railway, Beijing–Shanghai railway, Beijing–Harbin railway, Beijing–Chengde railway, Beijing–Tongliao railway, Beijing–Baotou railway and Fengtai–Shacheng railway. High-speed rail lines crossing the province include the Beijing–Shanghai high-speed railway, Beijing–Guangzhou high-speed railway, and Shijiazhuang–Taiyuan high-speed railway. 

During the Eleventh Five-Year Plan, Beijing and Hebei collaborated on a new passenger railway. The RMB 82.6 billion network will add  to the system.

Highways and primary routes 
The recent expressway boom in China included Hebei.

Air transit 
Shijiazhuang's Zhengding Airport is the province's center for air transportation, with domestic and international flights. Parts of Hebei are served by the Beijing Daxing International Airport in Beijing.

Ocean transit 
There are several ports along the Bohai Sea, including Huanghua, Jingtang, and Qinhuangdao. Qinhuangdao is the second busiest port in China and has a capacity of over 100 million tons.

Media 
Hebei is served by the province-wide Hebei Television, abbreviated HEBTV. Shijiazhuang Radio & Television is a regional network that covers the provincial capital. Hebei is also served by three major newspapers: Hebei Daily, Yanzhao Metropolis Daily, and Yanzhao Evening News. Hebei Daily Newspaper Group publishes all three newspapers.

Notable people 
Zu Chongzhi (429–500) – astronomer, mathematician, politician, inventor, and writer known for calculating pi to an accuracy that was not surpassed for 800 years
Feng Dao (881–954) – inventor, printer, and politician
Zhang Fei (?–221) – military general during the Eastern Han dynasty and  Three Kingdoms period who became sworn brothers with Liu Bei and Guan Yu
Xia Gengqi (born 1933) – curator in the Beijing Palace Museum
Qin Shi Huang (259 BC–210 BC) – founder of the Qin dynasty and the first emperor of a unified China
Guo Jingjing (born 1981) – Olympic gold medalist diver and world champion
Jing Ke (?–227 BC) – retainer of Crown Prince Dan, assassin who attempted to murder Qin Shi Huang
Zhao Lirong (1928–2000) – Singer, film actress, and Ping opera performer
Deng Lun (born 1992) – actor who gained popularity from the xianxia drama, Ashes of Love
Liu Shichao or Hebei Pangzai – Internet personality known for his food and drink stunts
Yan Yuan (1635–1704) – Confucian philosopher
Zheng Yuanjie (born 1955) – Children's books author, and founder and writer of King of Fairy Tales 
Zanilia Zhao (born 1987) – television actress 
Zhao Yun or Zhao Zilong (?–229) – Military general who lived during the same period as Zhang Fei
Liu Zhesheng (柳哲生, 1914–1991) – ace-fighter pilot of Nationalist Air Force of China, a veteran of the War of Resistance-WWII

Sister subdivisions 
Hebei is a sister district with the following country states, districts, and other subdivisions:

  Athens (September 26, 2002)
  Buenos Aires Province (May 19, 1992)
  East Flanders (October 4, 1991)
  Goiás (March 24, 1999)
  Hauts-de-Seine (February 11, 1997)
  Iowa (July 22, 1983)
  Leningrad Oblast (July 20, 1992)
  Missouri (January 25, 1994)
  Nagano Prefecture (November 11, 1983)
  Pest County (May 27, 2015)
  South Chungcheong Province (October 19, 1994)
  Tottori Prefecture (June 9, 1986)
  Veneto (May 17, 1988)

See also 

 Dongyi Protectorate
 Hebei People
 List of prisons in Hebei
 Major national historical and cultural sites in Hebei

Notes

References

Citations

Sources 

 Economic profile for Hebei at HKTDC
Ponds, Paddies and Frontier Defence: Environmental and Economic Changes in Northern Hebei in Northern Song China (960–1127)

External link 

 
Provinces of the People's Republic of China
North China Plain
States and territories established in 1928